Wall Creek is a stream in the U.S. state of Oregon. It is a tributary to Hill Creek.

Wall Creek was named in the 1870s after one Andrew J. Walls.

References

Rivers of Oregon
Rivers of Jackson County, Oregon